The 1956 Latin Cup was the seventh edition of the annual Latin Cup which was played by clubs of the Southwest European nations of France, Italy, Portugal, and Spain. The tournament was hosted by Italy, and the Italian club AC Milan was the winner of the tournament after defeating Athletic Bilbao by a score of 3–1 in the final match.

Participating teams

Venues 

The host of the tournament was Italy, and all matches were played in one host stadium.

Tournament

Bracket

Semifinals

Third place match

Final

Goalscorers

See also 

 1956 Mitropa Cup, a similar competition

Notes

References

External links 

 Latin Cup (Full Results) from RSSSF

Latin Cup
International association football competitions hosted by Italy
June 1956 sports events in Europe
July 1956 sports events in Europe